Beameria is a genus of cicadas in the family Cicadidae. There are at least three described species in Beameria.

Species
These three species belong to the genus Beameria:
 Beameria ansercollis Sanborn & M. Heath in Sanborn, M. Heath, Phillips & J. Heath, 2011
 Beameria venosa (Uhler, 1888)
 Beameria wheeleri Davis, 1934

References

Further reading

 
 
 
 
 
 
 
 
 
 

Articles created by Qbugbot
Fidicinini
Cicadidae genera